Shark Bay is a World Heritage-listed bay in Western Australia. 

Shark Bay or Shark's Bay may also refer to:

Places

Australia
 Shark Bay Marine Park, Western Australia, a marine park adjacent to the bay
 Shark Bay Airport, within the marine park area
 Shark Bay (Sea World), a shark exhibit at Sea World, Gold Coast, Queensland
 Shire of Shark Bay, a local government area in Western Australia

Other places
 Shark's Bay, Sharm El Sheikh, a  locality near Sharm El Sheikh city, Egypt

Other uses
 Shark Bay (TV series), a 1996 Australian television series
 Shark Bay mallee (Eucalyptus roycei), a plant
 Shark Bay language, a language of Vanuatu
 Shark Bay platform, the codename of the ninth-generation Intel Centrino platform